Gastón Guzmán Muñoz (c. 1937 - August 28, 2019) was a Chilean singer-songwriter. A native of Angol, Chile, he was a founder, with his brother Eduardo (1940-2012), of the Chilean musical group, Quelentaro. Quelentaro recorded approximately 20 albums, telling stories, usually in the first person perspective, about the lives of workers, peasants, students, women, and settlers. In 2015, he was honored with the designation as a fundamental figure of Chilean music.

Discography

Quelentaro albums 
 1967 - Coplas al viento
 1968 - Huella campesina
 1969 - Leña gruesa
 1969 - Coplas libertarias a la historia de Chile, Vol.1
 1970 - Judas
 1972 - Cesante
 1972 - Coplas libertarias a la historia de Chile,
 1975 - Quiebracanto, tiempo de amor 1976 - Tiempos de amor 1977 - Qué de caminos 1979 - Buscando siembra 1982 - Lonconao 1983 - Reverdeciendo 1985 - Aquiebracanto 1988 -  "En Vivo" (grabado en 1985, en vivo, Teatro Gran Palace)
 1989 - Después de la tormenta 1996 - 8 de marzo 2002 - 8 de marzo, volumen 2 2005 - Por siempre (grabado en 2003, en vivo)
 2007 - Coplas libertarias a la historia de Chile, Vol. 1 y 2 (nuevas versiones)
 2011 - Coplas libertarias a la historia de Chile, Vol. 3 y 4 2013 - Copla del hijo Collaborations 
 1966 - Carpa de La Reina (de Violeta Parra)
 1979 - El cantar de la yunta (varios intérpretes)

 Books 
 2002: Amanocheciendo (LOM Ediciones)
 2005: Desde mi cuarto (Editorial GUIRAKA)
 2010: Coplas libertarias a la historia de Chile vol I, II, III y IV (autogestión con auspicio de la Municipalidad de Maipú)
 2013: Coplas al viento (autogestión)

 Books about Quelentaro 
2004: Quelentaro por dentro'' (Editorial Universidad de Los Lagos, Osorno), de Antolin Guzmán Valenzuela

See also
 Quelentaro on Spanish Wikipedia

References

1937 births
2019 deaths
Chilean musicians
People from Angol